Atelopus guitarraensis, the La Guitarra stubfoot toad, is a species of toads in the family Bufonidae endemic to Colombia. Its natural habitats are subtropical or tropical high-altitude grassland and rivers. It is threatened by habitat loss.

References

guitarraensis
Amphibians of Colombia
Amphibians of the Andes
Amphibians described in 2001
Taxonomy articles created by Polbot